2094 Magnitka is a Flora asteroid from the inner regions of the asteroid belt, approximately  in diameter. It was discovered on 12 October 1971, at and by the Crimean Astrophysical Observatory in Nauchnyj, on the Crimean peninsula. The discovery has not been attributed to an observing astronomer. It was later named for the city of Magnitogorsk.

Orbit and classification 

Magnitka is a member of the Flora family, one of the largest families of stony asteroids. It orbits the Sun in the inner main-belt at a distance of 2.0–2.4 AU once every 3 years and 4 months (1,218 days). Its orbit has an eccentricity of 0.10 and an inclination of 5° with respect to the ecliptic.

Naming 

This minor planet was named for the city of Magnitogorsk, Russia, one of the largest centers of metallurgy of the former Soviet Union. The city is located at the far-east of the Ural Mountains, about 250 kilometers southwest of the city of Chelyabinsk in the Chelyabinsk Oblast region, also known for the spectacular air-burst of the Chelyabinsk meteor in 2013. The official  was published by the Minor Planet Center on 1 April 1980.

Physical characteristics

Lightcurves 

In October 2006, two rotational lightcurves for Magnitka were obtained from photometric observations by Petr Pravec at Ondřejov Observatory and by John Menke at his Menke Observatory, respectively. Lightcurve analysis gave a concurring rotation period of 6.11 hours with a brightness variation of 0.80 and 0.86 magnitude, respectively, indicating a non-spheroidal shape for Magnitka. In March 2016, Pierre Antonini obtained a tentative lightcurve, which gave a period of 6.24 hours and an amplitude of 0.85.

Diameter and albedo 

According to the surveys carried out by the Infrared Astronomical Satellite IRAS, the Japanese Akari satellite, and NASA's Wide-field Infrared Survey Explorer with its subsequent NEOWISE mission, the asteroid measures between 9.9 and 12.7 kilometers in diameter and its surface has an albedo between 0.132. The Collaborative Asteroid Lightcurve Link agrees with Pravec's revised thermal WISE data, taking an albedo of 0.12, and a diameter of 12.17 kilometers with an absolute magnitude of 12.49.

Notes

References

External links 
 Lightcurve Database Query (LCDB), at www.minorplanet.info
 Dictionary of Minor Planet Names, Google books
 Asteroids and comets rotation curves, CdR – Geneva Observatory, Raoul Behrend
 Discovery Circumstances: Numbered Minor Planets (1)-(5000)  – Minor Planet Center
 
 

002094
002094
002094
Named minor planets
19711012